Pacific Gas & Electric v. Public Utilities Commission, 475 U.S. 1 (1986), was a United States Supreme Court case involving the requirement that San Francisco-based public utility Pacific Gas and Electric Company carry a message supplied by a public interest group in rebuttal to the messages the utility supplied in its newsletter which it placed in its billing envelope.

The rationale used by the regulatory agency was that the space in the billing envelope which could have material added that did not increase postage belonged to the ratepayers rather than the utility; thus the commission could order the utility to allow other groups to use that space subject to restrictions.

The U.S. Supreme Court found the order of the California Public Utilities Commission to be unconstitutional, as the right to speak includes the right not to carry messages one disagrees with. As the court stated, "the choice to speak includes within it the choice of what not to say."

This is one of the cases which has essentially granted, with very limited exceptions, the absolute right of a publisher to choose not to carry messages it does not agree with.

See also
 Pacific Gas & Electric Co. v. State Energy Resources Conservation and Development Commission (1983)
 Travelers Casualty & Surety Co. of America v. Pacific Gas & Elec. Co. (2007)
 List of United States Supreme Court cases, volume 475

External links
 

United States Supreme Court cases
United States Free Speech Clause case law
United States energy case law
1986 in United States case law
Pacific Gas and Electric Company
United States Supreme Court cases of the Burger Court